The Concordia Eagle was an African-American newspaper published in Vidalia, Louisiana. It was founded in 1873, and was a four-page Republican Party weekly paper. Its founder was Louisiana state legislator and local political boss David Young. The paper took and early and strong stance against the Exodusters movement. Young was succeeded as editor and operator by James Presley Ball, Jr., son of a prominent photographer, and an abolitionist and district court clerk in his own right. He later contributed to the Seattle Republican. In 1885, Love S. Cornwell , a former Kansas state legislator (driven out during Bleeding Kansas) assumed editorial control. Publication stopped in 1890, and very few surviving issues remain.

The papers motto was “Equal Rights to All Men”.

References

Defunct African-American newspapers
Publications established in 1873
Defunct newspapers published in Louisiana